Elisabeth Larsson (born December 30, 1971) is a Swedish applied mathematician and numerical analyst. She is a professor in the Department of Information Technology of Uppsala University, and the director of the Uppsala Multidisciplinary Centre for Advanced Computational Science.

Research
Larsson's research involves the applications of radial basis functions to scientific computing. It has included work on the propagation of sound waves through water, pricing of financial options, and simulation of the earth's climate.

Education and career
Larsson was born on December 30, 1971 in Ljusdal, and went to high school in Ljusdal. She earned a master's degree in engineering physics at Uppsala University in 1994, and completed a Ph.D. in numerical analysis at Uppsala University in 2000. Her dissertation was Domain Decomposition and Preconditioned Iterative Methods for the Helmholtz Equation.

She became a junior researcher in the Department of Information Technology at Uppsala University in 2001, and an assistant professor in 2007. She was promoted to senior lecturer (associate professor) in 2011 and professor in 2020.

Recognition
In 2007, Larsson was one of two winners of the Göran Gustafsson Award for outstanding young Swedish scientists.

References

External links
Home page

1971 births
Living people
20th-century Swedish mathematicians
21st-century Swedish mathematicians
Applied mathematicians
Numerical analysts
Academic staff of Uppsala University
20th-century women mathematicians
21st-century women mathematicians
Swedish women mathematicians
Scientific computing researchers
20th-century Swedish women